Egesina anfracta is a species of beetle in the family Cerambycidae of long-horned beetles. It was described by Gressitt in 1940.

References

Egesina
Beetles described in 1940